La Verne Ausman (February 18, 1930 - December 14, 2021) was a former member of the Wisconsin State Assembly.

Biography
Ausman was born on February 18, 1930, in Eau Claire, Wisconsin, to George and Anna (Sorenson) Ausman. After graduating from Elk Mound High School in Elk Mound, Wisconsin, he attended the farm short course at University of Wisconsin–Madison in 1949. Ausman was a farmer and cattle breeder.

Political career 
Ausman was a Republican.

He served as the Elk Mound town supervisor from 1961 to 1965. He was a director of the Tri-State Breeders Cooperative from 1961 to 1968 and became president in 1969. From 1971 to 1975, Ausman served as chairman of the Agency No. 5 school committee.

Ausman represented the 69th Assembly District in the Wisconsin State Assembly in 1975 and 1977. From 1981 to 1986, Ausman served as secretary of the Wisconsin Department of Agriculture, Trade, and Consumer Protection. From 1987 to 1989, he served as under deputy secretary for small communities and rural development in the Department of Agriculture. From 1989 to 1993, he served as administrator of the Farmers Home Administration of the United States Department of Agriculture during the administration of President George H. W. Bush.

In 2006, Ausman received an Aggie Award at the 43rd annual Eau Claire Farm Show in recognition of his more than 50 years of service to farmers and agri-businesses.

His great grandfather, Henry Ausman, represented Dunn County in Wisconsin's 32nd State Assembly in 1879.

References

Politicians from Eau Claire, Wisconsin
People from Elk Mound, Wisconsin
School board members in Wisconsin
Wisconsin city council members
Republican Party members of the Wisconsin State Assembly
University of Wisconsin–Madison College of Agricultural and Life Sciences alumni
Farmers from Wisconsin
United States Department of Agriculture officials
George H. W. Bush administration personnel
1930 births
Living people
People from Eau Claire, Wisconsin